This is a list of wars involving the Republic of Azerbaijan and its predecessor states, the Azerbaijan Democratic Republic and the Azerbaijan Soviet Socialist Republic.

List

Peacekeeping missions

See also 
 List of wars involving Russia
 List of wars involving Armenia
 List of wars involving Georgia (country)
 Military history of Azerbaijan

References 

 
Azerbaijan
Wars